Clare Wheeler (born 14 January 1998) is an Australian association football player who currently plays for Women's Super League club Everton and the Australia national team. She has represented Australia on the Australia women's national under-20 soccer team.

Early life 
Wheeler began playing soccer at age ten for a local club, the Adamstown Rosebud. At the age of 13, she was selected for the state youth league, Northern NSW. She was later selected for the Emerging Jets Program.

Club

Newcastle Jets 
In 2013 at the age of 15, Wheeler was selected to play for the Newcastle Jets for the 2013–14 Newcastle Jets W-League season. She made six appearances for the club playing primarily as a defender. The Jets finished in last place during the regular season with a  record. During the 2014 season, Wheeler made five appearances. The Jets finished in fifth place with a  record.

During the 2015-16 season, Wheeler made 11 appearances for the Jets. The club finished in sixth place with a  record. Returning to the Jets for the 2016-17 season, Wheeler made appearances in 11 of the 12 regular season matches. The Jets finished 
the season in fifth place with a  record.

Sydney FC 
Wheeler left Newcastle Jets to join Sydney FC ahead of the 2020–21 W-League season.

Fortuna Hjørring 
In June 2021, Wheeler left Australia to join Danish champions Fortuna Hjørring.

Everton 
In August 2022, Wheeler was loaned to English club Everton. In January 2023, at the end of her loan, she was signed by the club on a permanent basis.

International career 
In 2015, Wheeler was selected for the Young Matildas (under-20 national team) to compete at the 2015 AFC U-19 Women's Championship tournament in China.

In 2021, Wheeler made her debut for the senior team in a friendly against the Republic of Ireland.

Career statistics

Club

International

References

Living people
1998 births
Australian women's soccer players
Newcastle Jets FC (A-League Women) players
Sydney FC (A-League Women) players
Fortuna Hjørring players
Everton F.C. (women) players
A-League Women players
Women's association football fullbacks
Women's association football midfielders
People from Coffs Harbour
Sportswomen from New South Wales
Soccer players from New South Wales
Australia women's international soccer players
Australian expatriate sportspeople in England
Australian expatriate sportspeople in Denmark
Australian expatriate women's soccer players
Expatriate women's footballers in Denmark
Expatriate women's footballers in England
Elitedivisionen players